The Digital Cultures Lab (DCL) is a University of California research group based in Los Angeles, California. The lab is directed by Dr. Ramesh Srinivasan, an associate professor of Information Studies in the Graduate School of Education & Information Studies at the University of California, Los Angeles. The group was founded in the fall of 2013, and has steadily grown to include members of nearly every UC campus.

The Digital Cultures Lab offers a unique, people-focused analysis of new technologies as they spread across the world. Scholars at the lab examine and discuss the means by which new media technologies impact economics, cultures, politics, labor, and the environment through collaborations with global partners. They share their insights publicly through digital platforms, monthly blog-posts, interviews, consultancies, and collaborative research projects.

DCL faculty and students converge around critical current events to develop shared intellectual analysis and commentary to support each members’ public-facing work by facilitating important dialogue among academics and stakeholders through online platforms, and bi-annual events that bridge the academic and public worlds. This includes workshops with students looking at digital media and civic engagement, conversations with indigenous leaders around technology and climate change, and discussions around how drones may shift our identities, economies, and politics.

Partners of the Digital Cultures Lab
University of California, Berkeley
University of California, Davis
University of California, Irvine
University of California, Merced
University of California, Riverside
University of California, Santa Barbara
University of California, Santa Cruz
University of California, San Diego

References

University of California
Laboratories in California
University and college laboratories in the United States